Gamberale is a village and comune in the Province of Chieti in the Abruzzo region of central Italy.
 

Common Family Names

Population

Most recent data about Population 
On 1 January 2016 there were 320 inhabitants in Gamberale, 147 males and 173 females. There were 3 inhabitants less than one year old (1 male and 2 females) and 0 inhabitants being one-hundred years old or more.

Official Website 
http://www.comune.gamberale.ch.it/

See also 

Castello di Gamberale

References 

http://italia.indettaglio.it/eng/abruzzo/gamberale.html

 
Cities and towns in Abruzzo
Ski areas and resorts in Italy